Rodney Litchfield (1939 – 5 September 2020) was an actor known for Early Doors (2003), Sunshine (2008) and Grow Your Own (2007).

Career 
Litchfield's first television appearances were in the 1980s, the first of which was the episode First Leg of the British drama Travelling Man.

He also made brief appearances in Juliet Bravo, A Touch of Frost, Cracker, Hetty Wainthropp Investigates, Heartbeat, and Peter Kay's Phoenix Nights.

Litchfield's best remembered television appearances were in Phil Mealey's and Craig Cash's dry-humoured sitcom Early Doors, which starred Litchfield as Tommy, a miserable pensioner who sits in the corner of the pub attempting to avoid social interaction with the rest of the pub's regulars, including avoiding accepting free drinks from anyone in case he is coerced into buying a 'round'.

After starring in the sitcom's only two series, he was seen driving a van onto the cobbles of Coronation Street as character Wilfred Morton with granddaughter Jodie (played by Samantha Seager) who were renovating the old Bakery owned by Diggory Compton into a takeaway. Michael Starke played Litchfield's son Jerry Morton.

Litchfield died on 5 September 2020, at the age of 81.

Filmography

References

External links
 

1939 births
2020 deaths
People from Wigan
20th-century English male actors
21st-century English male actors
English male soap opera actors
English male film actors
Male actors from Lancashire
Male actors from Greater Manchester